The 2008 Kitply cup, was a tri-series One Day International cricket tournament that was held in Bangladesh from 8 to 14 June 2008, between three test playing nations Bangladesh, Pakistan and India. In the final, Pakistan won the tournament by defeating India by 25 runs.

Squads

Fixtures

Points table

Group stage

Final

References

External links

 Series home at ESPN

Indian cricket tours of Bangladesh
International cricket competitions in 2008
2008 in Bangladeshi sport